"Put You in a Song" is a song co-written and recorded by Australian country music singer Keith Urban. It was released on September 13, 2010 as the first single from his 2010 album Get Closer. The song peaked at number 2 on the US Billboard Hot Country Songs chart. Urban wrote this song with Sarah Buxton and Jedd Hughes.

Content
"Put You in a Song" is about a guy's desire to write a song about the girl he adores. According to Urban, it's about a "guy in love with the unattainable girl. And the idea that the only chance that this poor guy is ever going to have to get close to the object of his affection is to put her in a song...that way he'd be able to take her with him everywhere he goes...day and night."

Music video
The music video premiered on October 1, 2010 during CMT's Big New Music Weekend. It features footage of Keith Urban recording the song in a studio and was shot/directed by Brad Belanger.

Critical reception
Matt Bjorke of Roughstock gave the song a four-out-of-five star rating, citing it "a sing-a-long quality song that will no doubt rocket up the country radio charts." Leeann Ward of Country Universe gave the song a B+ grade, concluding her review by comparing the sound to the tracks on Urban's 2004 album Be Here, and calling it "hopeful for the upcoming album."

Chart performance
"Put You in a Song" debuted at number 29 on the U.S. Billboard Hot Country Songs chart for the week of October 2, 2010. It soon peaked at number 2 on that chart, behind Kenny Chesney's "Somewhere with You". It also debuted at number 82 on the U.S. Billboard Hot 100 chart for the week of October 2, 2010, and number 66 on the Canadian Hot 100 chart for the week of October 9, 2010.

Year-end charts

Certifications

References

2010 singles
2010 songs
Keith Urban songs
Songs written by Keith Urban
Song recordings produced by Dann Huff
Songs written by Sarah Buxton
Capitol Records Nashville singles
Songs written by Jedd Hughes